The men's 4 × 400 metres relay event at the 2015 Military World Games was held on 7 and 8 October at the KAFAC Sports Complex.

Records
Prior to this competition, the existing world and CISM record were as follows:

Schedule

Medalists

Results

Round 1
Qualification: First 2 in each heat (Q) and next 2 fastest (q) qualified for the semifinals.

Final

References

4 x 400 metres relay